Einar Ólafsson (born 1 May 1962) is a retired Icelandic cross-country skier. He competed at the 1984 and 1988 Winter Olympics in 15–50 km events and placed 44–65. He was the flag bearer for Iceland at the 1988 games at Calgary. He won multiple national championships during his career.

References

1962 births
Einar Olafsson 
Cross-country skiers at the 1984 Winter Olympics
Cross-country skiers at the 1988 Winter Olympics
Living people
Einar Olafsson
Einar Olafsson
20th-century Icelandic people